Veyvah (Dhivehi: ވޭވައް) is one of the inhabited islands of Meemu Atoll.

Geography

Demography

Healthcare
Veyvah has a pharmacy. The island was severely affected by an outbreak of dengue fever in 2011, which led to a mosquito eradication programme.

Transport
The reconstruction of Veyvah harbour was contracted to MTCC in 2017.

Old Friday Mosque 
The island houses one of the oldest historical mosques in the Maldives. The Old Friday mosque is believed to be over 400 years old and is built out of coral stone. The mosque complex consists of the original mosque building, two water wells and a cemetery. However, extension projects surrounding the original mosques have meant that the original Friday mosque is practically inside the current mosque building.

References

Islands of the Maldives